"Everything to Everyone" is a song by American alternative rock band Everclear, released as the first single off their album So Much for the Afterglow (1997). It was commercially successful, topping the US Billboard Modern Rock Tracks chart in December 1997. It also hit No. 15 on the Mainstream Rock Tracks chart, and No. 43 on the Hot 100 Airplay chart, as chart rules at the time prevented it from reaching the main Hot 100 listing.

The song was used in the film American Pie, but did not appear on the soundtrack.

A music video was produced to promote the single.

Content
In an October 2003 interview with Songfacts, lead singer Art Alexakis explained the meaning behind "Everything to Everyone":

When asked if the song had "anything to do with the record business", Alexakis replied, "Oh yeah. Anything in the entertainment business you'll find people who are slimy."

Charts

References

1997 singles
1997 songs
Capitol Records singles
Everclear (band) songs
Song recordings produced by Neal Avron
Songs written by Art Alexakis
Songs written by Craig Montoya
Songs written by Greg Eklund